Markéta Hájková (born 14 March 2000) is a Czech professional racing cyclist, who currently rides for UCI Women's Continental Team .

References

External links
 

2000 births
Living people
Czech female cyclists
Place of birth missing (living people)